Dortmund-Westerfilde is a railway station on the Welver–Sterkrade railway situated in Dortmund in western Germany. It is classified by Deutsche Bahn as a category 6 station. It is served by Rhine-Ruhr S-Bahn line S 2 every 30 minutes. It offers connections to line U47 of the Dortmund Stadtbahn at 10-minute intervals on working days as well as two bus routes, 470 (Mengede – Kirchlinde – Lütgendortmund – Oespel (– 440 Barop) and 471 (Nette – Mengede – Oestrich – Bodelschwingh), both operated by Dortmunder Stadtwerke (DSW21) at 20-minute intervals on working days.

References

Railway stations in Dortmund
S2 (Rhine-Ruhr S-Bahn)
Rhine-Ruhr S-Bahn stations
Dortmund VRR stations
Railway stations in Germany opened in 1991